The Angel and the Rain is the debut album of the Italian Gothic metal band, The LoveCrave. It was released in 2006 by Repo Records and in America by Alive Records.

History
The album was in 2006 at rockeyez.com in the 10 best-selling releases of the year.

Style

The Italian quartet, led by frontwoman Francesca Chiara, presents ten wonderfully refreshing songs on their debut album. The band's focus on the piano and the reef-chasing vocal melody is complemented with some electronics and enhanced by a relatively memorable chorus, which is only made possible with a female singer.

Track list

Single declutching
 2006 – Zilloscope 11/06 (ZILLO mag – DE) – "Little Suicide"
 2006 – Cold Hands Seduction Vol.64 (SONIC SEDUCER mag – DE) – "Vampires (The Light That We Are)"
 2006 – Loud Sounds (ROCK HARD mag – ITA) – "Nobody"
 2006 – ClubTRAX Vol. 2 Double CD (XtraX store – DE) – "Little Suicide"
 2007 – Rock Sound Magazine Collection 103 (ROCK SOUND mag – ITA) – "Can You Hear Me?"
 2007 – Gothic Magazine Compilation – "Can You Hear Me?"
 2007 – Summer Darkness 07 (ZILLO mag – DE) – "Can You Hear Me?"
 2007 – Fuck The Mainstream – "Little Suicide"

Credits
Francesca Chiara – whispering and screams
Tank Palamara – guitar
Simon Dredo – bass guitar
Iakk – drums

Footnotes

External links
 BellaOnline review.
 Rockeyez.com review.
 Side-line review.

2006 debut albums
The LoveCrave albums